Following the collapse of the communist regime in Albania in 1991, the number of magazines increased. It was 71 in 2001 based on the data of the Albanian Media Institute in Tirana. In the following year it was 70. In terms of frequency, the magazines were mostly weekly, bimonthly and quarterly.

The following is an incomplete list of current and defunct magazines published in Albania. They may be published in Albanian or in other languages.

A

 AKS
Albania
 Albanian Journal of Natural and Technical Sciences
Albanian Observer
Albania Today 
 Aleph

D
Drita

F
Fiamuri Arbërit
Fjala e Tokësorit

G
Gjuha Jonë
Gazeta e Pavarur

H
Hosteni
Hylli i Dritës

K
Klan
 Kritika
Kultura Popullore

L
 Les lettres albanaises

M
Mapo
Mehr Licht
Monitor

O
OK! Albania

P
Përpjekja
Përpjekja shqiptare

S
Spekter
Studia Albanica
 Studime Filologjike
 Studime Historike

See also
List of newspapers in Albania

References

Magazines
Albania